Galvin (Gallivan) is a name of Irish extraction and originated as part of the Dál Cais dynasty. Notable people with the surname include:

Bob Galvin (1922–2011), Chairman and CEO of Motorola
Connor Galvin, American football player
Elliot Galvin, British musician
Fred Galvin, American mathematician
John Galvin (soldier), American general and academic administrator
John Galvin (Irish politician), Irish Fianna Fáil politician
John Galvin, keyboardist for Molly Hatchet
Keith Galvin, Gaelic footballer
Kevin Galvin, business activist
Martin Galvin, Irish-American lawyer and political activist
Mick Galvin Irish footballer
Noah Galvin, American actor
Pat Galvin (1911–1980), Australian politician
Pat Galvin (public servant) (born 1933), Australian public servant
Patrick Galvin, Irish writer and poet
Patrick Galvin (footballer) (1882–1918), English footballer
Paul Galvin (businessman), founder of Galvin Manufacturing Corporation, later renamed Motorola
Paul Galvin (Gaelic footballer), Irish footballer
Pud Galvin, American baseball player
Sheila Galvin Irish politician
Tony Galvin, Irish soccer player
William Francis Galvin (b. 1950), Massachusetts Secretary of the Commonwealth